Charles Day may refer to:

 Boots Day (Charles Day, born 1947), former baseball player
 Charles Day (boot blacking manufacturer) (died 1836), founder of Day and Martins Blacking
 Charles Day (Medal of Honor) (1844–1901), American soldier in the American Civil War
 Charles Day (engineer) (1879–1931), American engineer and co-founder of Day & Zimmermann
 Charles Day (rower) (1914–1962), American rower
 Charlie Day (Charles Peckham Day, born 1976), American actor
 Charles Bernard Day (born 1957), American judicial nominee
 Charles Dewey Day (1806–1884), Canadian judge
 Charles W. Day (1836–1906), Wisconsin state senator from De Pere, Wisconsin
 Charles Wayne Day (1942–2008), American blues guitarist